Leonor Martín Taibo (Madrid, August 1, 1989) is a Spanish architect and actress known for playing Cova in the popular series Física o Química.

Professional career 
Leonor Martín made her film debut in 2005 with the movie El penalti más largo del mundo in 2005.

She made her television debut in the series Física o química in 2008, where she played Covadonga Ariste Espinel, better known as Cova, until the third season as the main character. She returned in the fifth season until the seventh season as a recurring character and as a guest character.

In 2011 she joined El secreto de Puente Viejo, playing Gregoria Casas, the new town doctor.

In cinema, she has participated as a cameo in the films Muertos de amor and as a supporting character in En apatía: Secuelas del odio. She also participated in the film Madrid, above the moon.

In 2015 she filmed the series Aula de castigo.

In 2020, it was confirmed that the actress would return to play Covadonga Ariste Espinel in Física o químicaː El reencuentro for its Atresplayer Premium platform.

In January 2021, after participating in Física o químicaː El reencuentro it was announced that she would join the daily series Acacias 38 to play Dori Navarro.

Filmography

Cinema

Television series

Short films

References

External links 
 Leonor Martín on IMDb

Spanish television actresses
Spanish film actresses
Living people
1989 births